Lee County is a county located in the U.S. state of South Carolina. As of the 2020 census, its population was 16,531, making it the fifth-least populous county in South Carolina. Its county seat is Bishopville.

History 
The county is named for Confederate general Robert E. Lee. A previous incarnation of Lee County was established in 1898 and was disestablished the next year. The current Lee County formed on December 15, 1902.

Geography

State and local protected areas 
 Lee State Natural Area
 Longleaf Pine Heritage Preserve/Wildlife Management Area (part)
 Lynchburg Savanna Heritage Preserve/Wildlife Management Area
 Mary McLeod Bethune Birthplace

Major water bodies 
 Black River
 Lynches River

Adjacent counties
 Darlington County - northeast
 Florence County - east
 Sumter County - south
 Kershaw County - northwest

Major highways

Demographics

2020 census

As of the 2020 United States census, there were 16,531 people, 6,423 households, and 3,971 families residing in the county.

2010 census
At the 2010 census, there were 19,220 people, 6,797 households, and 4,567 families living in the county. The racial makeup of the county was 64.3% black or African American, 33.4% white, 0.3% Asian, 0.3% American Indian, 0.8% from other races, and 0.9% from two or more races. Those of Hispanic or Latino origin made up 1.7% of the population. In terms of ancestry, 24.9% were American, and 5.1% were English.

Of the 6,797 households, 32.7% had children under the age of 18 living with them, 37.5% were married couples living together, 24.0% had a female householder with no husband present, 32.8% were non-families, and 29.3% of households were made up of individuals. The average household size was 2.54 and the average family size was 3.15. The median age was 38.9 years.

The median household income was $23,378 and the median family income  was $35,279. Males had a median income of $32,721 versus $26,769 for females. The per capita income for the county was $12,924. About 25.8% of families and 29.9% of the population were below the poverty line, including 40.9% of those under age 18 and 16.7% of those age 65 or over.

2000 census
At the 2000 census there were 20,119 people, 6,886 households, and 4,916 families living in the county.  The population density was 49 people per square mile (19/km2).  There were 7,670 housing units at an average density of 19 per square mile (7/km2).  The racial makeup of the county was 63.56% Black or African American,  35.03% White,  0.13% Native American, 0.19% Asian, 0.59% from other races, and 0.49% from two or more races.  1.31% of the population were Hispanic or Latino of any race.
Of the 6,886 households 32.70% had children under the age of 18 living with them, 43.00% were married couples living together, 23.80% had a female householder with no husband present, and 28.60% were non-families. 25.90% of households were one person and 10.60% were one person aged 65 or older.  The average household size was 2.68 and the average family size was 3.23.

The age distribution was 25.80% under the age of 18, 10.00% from 18 to 24, 29.20% from 25 to 44, 22.60% from 45 to 64, and 12.40% 65 or older.  The median age was 36 years. For every 100 females there were 101.40 males.  For every 100 females age 18 and over, there were 101.10 males.

The median household income was $26,907 and the median family income  was $34,209. Males had a median income of $26,512 versus $18,993 for females. The per capita income for the county was $13,896.  About 17.70% of families and 21.80% of the population were below the poverty line, including 25.60% of those under age 18 and 27.90% of those age 65 or over.

Law and government

Law enforcement
In 2010, Lee County Sheriff Edgar Jerome “E.J.” Melvin and six others were arrested on federal drug conspiracy charges. Court documents stated that he dealt cocaine from his police SUV, and other dealers gave him the nickname "Big Dog." Melvin was found guilty and sentenced to 17 years in prison.

Politics

Communities

Towns 
 Bishopville (county seat and largest town)
 Lynchburg

Census-designated places
 Ashwood
 Browntown
 Elliott
 Manville
 St. Charles
 Wisacky

Other unincorporated communities
 Alcot
 Lucknow
 Spring Hill
 Una

See also
 List of counties in South Carolina
 National Register of Historic Places listings in Lee County, South Carolina
 South Carolina State Parks
 List of memorials to Robert E. Lee
 Lee County Courthouse
 Lizard Man of Scape Ore Swamp

References

External links

 
 
 Lee County School District

 
1902 establishments in South Carolina
Populated places established in 1902
Black Belt (U.S. region)
Majority-minority counties in South Carolina